Joyce Lazaro Ndalichako is Minister of State (Policy, Parliament, Labour, Employment, Youth and the Disabled) in the Office of the Prime Minister of Tanzania. Previously she served as Minister of Education, Science, Technology and Vocational Training. She was appointed by the president of United Republic of Tanzania, John Magufuli, as a Member of Parliament and Minister for Education, Science, Technology and Vocational Training from 2015 in Tanzania.

Early life and education
She was born on May 21, 1964, in Musoma, Mara Region in Tanzania. She attended University of Dar Es Salaam from 1987–1991, where she graduated with Bachelor of Science with education, majoring in mathematics. During 1993–1997 she went to  University of Alberta, Edmonton, Alberta, Canada, where she obtained a PhD in educational psychology, major in educational statistics & measurement and evaluation.

Career
From 2000 to 2005 she was the senior lecturer at the University of Dar Es Salaam teaching educational measurement and evaluation, research methods, and educational statistics, supervising dissertation of the  students.

From 2014 to date she has been  the associate professor and deputy head researcher at Agha Khan University Institute for Educational Development, East Africa

References

Living people
Chama Cha Mapinduzi MPs
Tanzanian MPs 2015–2020
Tanzanian MPs 2020–2025
Nominated Tanzanian MPs
1964 births
People from Musoma
Tanzanian Roman Catholics